Casualties of the Tigray War refers to the civilian and military deaths and injuries in the Tigray War that started in November 2020, in which rape and other sexual violence are also widespread.
Precise casualty figures are uncertain. According to researchers at Ghent University in Belgium, as many as 600,000 people had died as a result of war-related violence and famine by late 2022. The scale of the death and destruction led The New York Times to describe it in November 2022 as "one of the world’s bloodiest contemporary conflicts."

Breakdown 

True casualties statistics have been difficult to determine, largely due to deliberate information blackouts in the region. Journalists have noted the difficulty they face attempting to report on the war, as the Ethiopian government has taken steps to reduce press access to the Tigray Region, facing the risk of getting killed or imprisoned. It is also been reported that there is an unwillingness from either side to fully confirm precise numbers.

While Prime Minister of Ethiopia Abiy Ahmed initially spoke of no civilian casualties in the early days of the war, by February 2021, he described the level of death in Tigray as "hav[ing] caused much distress for me personally.”

Massacres 

Numerous reports have been made of extrajudicial killings and summary executions (in many cases, targeting civilians) since the war began.

Terminology:
 ENDF - Ethiopian National Defense Forces

 EDF - Eritrean Defense Forces

 TPLF - Tigray People's Liberation Front
 TDF - Tigrayan Defense Forces

Fano - Amhara public force or Amhara resistance force

Civilian deaths

, the highest estimate of civilian deaths in the Tigray War is that stated by three of the opposition parties of the 2020 Tigray regional election, National Congress of Great Tigray, Tigray Independence Party and Salsay Woyane Tigray, who were allocated 15 seats in September 2020, prior to the war. The three parties' February 2021 statement (published 2 February) estimated that at least 52,000 civilians had been killed by the ENDF, the Eritrean Defence Forces (EDF), Amhara militias, and other forces allied with the ENDF. Hailu Kebede, head of foreign affairs in Salsay Woyane Tigray, stated that the three parties' data collection method was to try to register data from witnesses in every administrative area in Tigray Region. He stated that "thousands" of names were already recorded. Belgium’s Ghent University's 2022 estimates put the number of dead at due to the war at 300,000 to 500,000 including 50,000 to 100,000 deaths from fighting, 150,000 to 200,000 deaths due to famine and 100,000 deaths from lack of medical attention.

Military deaths

2020
An ENDF soldier present at the attack on the Adigrat base of the ENDF Northern Command during the 4 November Northern Command attacks, Bulcha, stated to BBC News that there were 32 ENDF fatalities and 100 TPLF fatalities.

Based on its 14–18 November 2020 visit and a visit starting 10 January 2021 to the Tigray Region, the Ethiopian Human Rights Commission (EHRC) reported a Humera hospital employee's count of the war deaths as 92, including military (ENDF and TPLF) and civilian deaths.

An estimated 760 troops (ENDF and TPLF) were killed during fighting in the Raya region.

The TPLF claimed on 24 November to have killed thousands of ENDF and Eritrean in three fronts: Adwa, Idagahamus and Ray-Mokoni. They also claimed to have killed almost an entire Ethiopian division during fighting at Raya. This division is the 21st mechanised division.

On 7 December 2020 heavy fighting broke out between AMISOM troops and Ethiopian troops in Hiran region, Somalia, when Ethiopian troops tried to disarm Tigrayan troops. In total 21 Tigrayan soldiers and 20 Ethiopian soldiers were killed.

Notes

References

External links
 fully documented civilian casualties 
 documented casualties 

Tigray War
Tigray War